The Central Lakes State Trail is a paved recreational rail trail in central Minnesota, USA, running along a former Burlington Northern Railroad line. The trail is marked with mileposts every mile, corresponding with the mile markers of the former railroad line. Snowmobile use is allowed on the trail in winter, conditions permitting.

Description of the trail
The  trail begins in Osakis at the western end of the Lake Wobegon Trail and runs parallel to Interstate 94 before ending in Fergus Falls. This trail passes through the towns of Nelson, Alexandria, Garfield, Brandon, Evanston, Melby, Ashby, and Dalton.  The Central Lakes and Lake Wobegon trails combine for a continuous  trail.

References

External links
 Central Lakes State Trail
 Central Lakes Trail Association

Burlington Northern Railroad
Protected areas of Douglas County, Minnesota
Protected areas of Grant County, Minnesota
Minnesota state trails
Protected areas of Otter Tail County, Minnesota
Rail trails in Minnesota